Astrid Øyre Slind (born 9 February 1988) is a Norwegian cross-country skier.

She competed at the 2009, 2010 and 2011 Junior World Championships (U23 class). In 2009 she won the silver medal in the 15 km pursuit, and in 2010 the gold medal in the same event. At the 2013 Winter Universiade she won the bronze medal in the 15 km and the gold medal in the 5 km.

She made her World Cup debut in March 2008 at the Holmenkollen ski festival, finishing 44th in the 30 km. In her next race she also collected her first World Cup points, finishing 22nd in the December 2008 Davos 10 km. Another highlight was the March 2009 races in Falun, where she finished 20th in the sprint and 25th overall. Her last World Cup outing came at the 2014 Holmenkollen ski festival.

On 6 March 2022, she won the women's edition of Vasaloppet.

She represents the sports club Oppdal IL. She is a twin sister of Silje Øyre Slind and older sister of Kari Øyre Slind.

Cross-country skiing results
All results are sourced from the International Ski Federation (FIS).

World Championships
 2 medals – (1 gold, 1 bronze)

World Cup

Season standings

Individual podiums
 2 podiums – (2 )

References

External links

1988 births
Living people
People from Oppdal
Norwegian female cross-country skiers
Norwegian twins
Twin sportspeople
Sportspeople from Trøndelag
FIS Nordic World Ski Championships medalists in cross-country skiing